Häckeberga Castle is a mansion at Lund Municipality in  Scania,  Sweden. The estate dates back to the 14th century 
and is located on one of the seven islets of  Lake  Häckebergasjön. The manor house was built in French Renaissance style between 1873 and 1875 by Tönnes Wrangel von Brehmer after drawings by Helgo Zettervall  (1831-1907). It currently (2022) hosts a boutique hotel, restaurant with former Michelin star chef and conference facility.

See also
List of castles in Sweden

References

External links
Häckeberga slot website

 Buildings and structures in Skåne County